The Camarodonta are an order of globular sea urchins in the class Echinoidea. The fossil record shows that camarodonts have been in existence since the Lower Cretaceous.

Characteristics
All camarodonts have imperforate tubercles and compound ambulacral plates with the lowest elements enlarged. The pores are at regular intervals along the ambulacral plates from the apex to the mouth opening or peristome. The Aristotle's lantern, or jaw system, has keeled teeth with the supports meeting above the "foramen magnum".

Families
According to World Register of Marine Species:
 Infraorder Echinidea (Kroh & Smith, 2010)
 Family Echinidae (Gray, 1825)
 Superfamily Odontophora (Kroh & Smith, 2010)
 Family Echinometridae (Gray, 1855)
 Family Strongylocentrotidae (Gregory, 1900)
 Family Toxopneustidae (Troschel, 1872)
 Family Parechinidae (Mortensen, 1903b)
 Family Parasaleniidae (Mortensen, 1903b)
 Infraorder Temnopleuridea (Kroh & Smith, 2010)
 Family Temnopleuridae (A. Agassiz, 1872)
 Family Trigonocidaridae (Mortensen, 1903b)

References

 
Echinacea (animals)